Kayla Day and Sophia Whittle were the defending champions but chose not to participate.

Katarzyna Kawa and Tereza Mihalíková won the title, defeating Liang En-shuo and Rebecca Marino in the final, 6–3, 4–6, [10–6].

Seeds

Draw

Draw

References
Main Draw

Rancho Santa Fe Open - Doubles